Southdale may refer to:

 Southdale (electoral district), a provincial electoral district in Manitoba, Canada, in southeast Winnipeg
 Southdale Center, the first fully enclosed and completely climate-controlled shopping mall in the US, located in Edina, Minnesota
 Southdale, Nova Scotia, a neighbourhood in Dartmouth, Nova Scotia
 Southdale, South Africa, a suburb of Johannesburg